Shelley Riley Moore (July 15, 1926 – September 13, 2014) was an American educator who served as the First Lady of West Virginia from 1969–77, and from 1985-89 during the tenure of her husband, former Governor Arch A. Moore Jr. and the mother of U.S. Senator Shelley Moore Capito.

Moore's twelve-year tenure was the longest of any first lady in West Virginia's history. Moore founded the West Virginia Mansion Preservation Foundation in 1985 to preserve the state Governor's Mansion. She was the mother of West Virginia politician, Shelley Moore Capito. Moore's grandchildren, Moore Capito and Riley Moore, are also politicians.

Moore was born Sadie Shelley Riley in Miami, Florida, on July 15, 1926, the daughter of Sadie Wardlow (née Wellens) and Jacob Lewis Riley. While earning a degree in education at West Virginia University, she met Arch A. Moore Jr., whom she married in 1949. She taught school in Pennsylvania for several years before her husband entered politics. After serving for a dozen years in the United States House of Representatives, Arch Moore was elected Governor. As First Lady, she gave speeches throughout West Virginia and appeared at college campuses, vocational facilities, library dedication ceremonies, and before civic and religious groups. She took an interest in promoting the West Virginia Governor's Mansion and offered public tours of the mansion.  She also conducted televised tours and started the West Virginia Mansion Preservation Foundation to help restore and maintain the mansion.

Moore died, aged 88, on September 13, 2014, at the Arthur B. Hodges Center in Charleston, West Virginia. She and her husband were residents of Glen Dale, West Virginia.

References

1926 births
2014 deaths
First Ladies and Gentlemen of West Virginia
Historical preservationists
American educators
West Virginia University alumni
People from Miami
People from Glen Dale, West Virginia
Moore family of West Virginia